Yeysk Spit or Kosa Yeyskaya   is an alluvial sandy spit in the Sea of Azov, part of the Yeysk Peninsula. The central resort area of ​​the city of Yeysk. The length of the sand spit is about 3 km, before 1914 storm it reached 9 km.

History 
On March 13, 1914, a strong hurricane broke out, part of the spit was washed away, its stem was cut away and it turned into an island.

See also 
 Spits of Azov Sea
 Dolgaya Spit

References 

Destroyed landforms
Spits of the sea of Azov
Spits of Krasnodar Krai